Condica discistriga is a species of moth in the family Noctuidae (the owlet moths). It is found in North America.

The MONA or Hodges number for Condica discistriga is 9692.

References

Further reading

 
 
 

Condicinae
Articles created by Qbugbot
Moths described in 1894